Freshjive is an American streetwear brand founded in 1989 by artist and entrepreneur Rick Klotz. The brand drew its roots from surf culture and skate culture and is famous for its artwork including controversial topics such as Palestine, animal studies, police brutality, domestic violence and Pentagon's black operations. In 2011 Complex Magazine named Freshjive as the #4 Greatest Streetwear Brand after Stüssy, Supreme and A Bathing Ape.

In 2009, Freshjive removed the name of the brand from all  products.

See also 

Highsnobiety
 Punk fashion
 Street fashion
Dover Street Market
Anti Social Social Club
Billionaire Boys Club
Virgil Abloh
OVO

References

External links
Official website

Clothing brands of the United States
Street fashion
1989 establishments in the United States